Scott Tunbridge (born 26 June 1982) is an Australian soccer player who plays for Adelaide Raiders.

External links 
 Newcastle Jets profile
 Oz Football profile

1982 births
Living people
Australian soccer players
Association football forwards
Para Hills Knights players
A-League Men players
National Soccer League (Australia) players
FFSA Super League players
National Premier Leagues players
Adelaide City FC players
South Melbourne FC players
Cumberland United FC players
Hamilton Academical F.C. players
Newcastle Jets FC players
North Eastern MetroStars SC players
Adelaide Raiders SC players
Australian expatriate soccer players
Australian expatriate sportspeople in Scotland
Expatriate footballers in Scotland
Soccer players from Adelaide